The 2018 Calderdale Metropolitan Borough Council election took place on 3 May 2018 to elect members of Calderdale Metropolitan Borough Council in England. This was on the same day as other local elections. One councillor was elected in each ward for a four-year term so the councillors elected in 2018 last stood for election in 2014. Each ward is represented by three councillors, the election of which is staggered, so only one third of the councillors were elected in this election. Before the election there was no overall control with a minority Labour administration. Following the election Labour, having gained one councillor, was still two councillors away from a majority so it remained no overall control.

Independent Conservative Councillor Mike Payne of Sowerby Bridge Ward, who was suspended from the Conservative Party in April 2018, was reinstated into the party during this election cycle.

Council results

Council Composition
Prior to the election the composition of the council was:

After the election the composition of the council was:

Reaction

The local paper, the Halifax Courier, said that the Labour group were happiest with the result having got closer to overall control.
When the leaders of the groups were later interviewed, Tim Swift, leader of the Labour group, highlighted the win of Skircoat ward and said that the overall result was pretty good for Labour. James Baker, leader of the Liberal Democrat group, highlighted the first win of a new ward in Calderdale as opposed to merely a successful defence since 2010 when the national Liberal Democrat party went into coalition with the Conservatives in the UK parliament. Baker said that they would work with labour to get what they could of their policies enacted. Scott Benton, leader of the Conservative group, highlighted that Labour had failed to gain overall control despite the point in the national political cycle being a good time for opposition parties. Specifically Labour had been in opposition for 8 years at this point. Benton described the Conservative performance as solid.

Ward results
The ward results listed below are based on the changes from the last time this third was up for election, in the 2014 elections, not taking into account any mid-term by-elections or party defections.

Brighouse ward

The incumbent was Howard Blagborough for the Conservative Party. In the 2014 election both a UKIP candidate & an Independent candidate got over 20% of the vote but neither stood in this election. The swing is expressed between the Conservative & Labour Parties.

Calder ward

The incumbent was Alison Miles for the Labour Party who stepped down at this election. The swing is expressed between Labour & Green as Green were second in 2014. There was a 9.1% swing from Conservatives to Labour.

Elland ward

The incumbent was Angie Gallagher for the Labour Party.

Greetland & Stainland ward

The incumbent was Marilyn Greenwood for the Liberal Democrats. UKIP did not stand a candidate this time where they had polled over 20% last time. The swing is from Conservative to Liberal.

Hipperholme & Lightcliffe ward

The incumbent was Colin Raistrick, an Independent. The swing was 11.6 from Independent to Conservative & there was a 2.7% swing from Labour to Conservative.

Illingworth & Mixenden ward

The incumbent was Dan Sutherland for the Labour Party. There was a swing of 3.8% from Labour to Conservative. UKIP which did not stand this time got over 35% of the vote in 2014.

Luddendenfoot ward

The incumbent was Jill Smith-Moorhouse for the Conservative Party. The biggest swing was 15.1% from Green to Labour.

Northowram & Shelf ward

The incumbent was Stephen Baines for the Conservative party who was the deputy leader of the Conservative group at the time of the election. UKIP was second place in 2014 with almost 35% of the vote but did not stand this time.

Ovenden ward

The incumbent was Helen Rivron for the Labour Party. There was a swing of 4.8% from Labour to Conservative. The biggest swing was 7.9% from Liberal to Green.

Park ward

The incumbent was Ferman Ali for the Labour Party who stepped down at this election. Amjad Bashir standing for the Conservatives is a sitting MEP for Yorkshire & Humber where he was elected for UKIP and defected to the Conservatives. There was a 20.6% swing from Labour to the Independent and a 29.6% swing from Conservatives to the Independent. Surraya Bibi standing as an Independent was previously a member of the Labour Party but resigned complaining that the candidate selection process was not working correctly.

Rastrick ward

The incumbent was Christine Beal for the Conservative Party who stood down at this election. TUSC which did not stand this time had polled 8.1% in 2014.

Ryburn ward

The incumbent was Robert Holden, standing as an Independent. He was elected for the Conservative Party in 2014 but resigned after whistleblowing over irregularities in the 2015 election accounts having also disagreed with the 2016 candidate selection.

Skircoat ward

The incumbent was Andrew Tagg for the Conservative Party. UKIP polled 17% in 2014 but did not stand this time. The local paper described this result as a shock and the first time Skircoat ward had been held by Labour since the formation of Calderdale council 44 years earlier.

Sowerby Bridge ward

The incumbent was Dot Foster for the Labour Party. UKIP did not stand this time but polled 27% in 2014. There was a swing of 2.3% from Conservatives to Labour.

Todmorden ward

The incumbent was Susan Press for the Labour Party.

Town ward

The incumbent was Bob Metcalfe for the Labour Party. UKIP polled 37% in 2014 but did not stand this time.

Warley ward

The incumbent was Michelle Foster for the Labour Party who stood down at this election. There was a swing of 8.0% from Labour to Liberal Democrat & the largest swing was 14.8% from Conservative to Liberal Democrat.

References

2018 English local elections
2018
2010s in West Yorkshire